Wesermarsch is a Kreis (district) in the northwestern part of Lower Saxony, Germany. Neighboring are (from the east clockwise) the districts of Cuxhaven and Osterholz, the city of Bremen in the state Free Hanseatic City of Bremen, the urban district of Delmenhorst, the district of Oldenburg and the urban district of Oldenburg, and the districts of  Ammerland and Friesland.

Geography
The district is located at the western banks of the River Weser between Bremen and the river's mouth. Several rivers cross the district from west to east, the largest of them being the Hunte, which runs through Oldenburg before entering Wesermarsch. In the north the Weser mouth and the Jade Bight (a bay off the North Sea) enclose the Butjadingen peninsula. Here the largest town of the district is located: Nordenham, lying opposite to Bremerhaven at the Weser mouth.

History
The district was created in 1933 by merging the Ämter of Butjadingen, Brake and Elsfleth, and parts of the Ämter of Delmenhorst and Varel.

Partnerships
Since February 1991 the district has had a partnership with the German districts of Borken (North Rhine-Westphalia) and Ludwigslust (Mecklenburg-Vorpommern). A partnership with the English Borough of Havant has existed for several decades already, and in 1989 a partnership with the Russian city of Voronezh was established.

Coat of arms

Towns and municipalities

Literature
 Klaus Dede: Wesermarsch. Ein Heimatbuch. (1982)

References

External links

Official site 

 
Districts of Lower Saxony